2018 AFF Invitational Futsal Club Championship was the fourth edition of AFF Futsal Club Championship. The tournament was held in Yogyakarta, Indonesia from 15 to 21 July 2018. The defending champion was Thai Port.

Participants

Group A

Group B

Group stage 
All times are local, WIB (UTC+7).

Group A

Group B

Knockout stage

Bracket

Semi-finals

Third-place match

Final

Winner

Final ranking

References 

AFF Futsal Club Championship
International futsal competitions hosted by Indonesia
Sport in Yogyakarta
AFF Futsal Club Championship
AFF Futsal Club Championship
AFF Futsal Club Championship